Frederick Dixon may refer to:

 Frederick Whittaker Dixon (1854–1935), architect from Oldham, England
 Frederick Clifford Dixon (1902–1992), creator of etchings depicting urban life in London
 Fred Dixon (politician) (Frederick John Dixon, 1881–1931), Manitoba politician
 Freddie Dixon (Frederick William Dixon, 1892–1956), English motorcycle racer and racing car driver

See also 
 Fred Dixon (disambiguation)